Sir Ewen Alastair John Fergusson  (28 October 1932 – 20 April 2017) was a British diplomat and  international rugby union player.

The son of Sir Ewen MacGregor Field Fergusson, formerly Chairman and Managing Director of the Straits Trading Company, Singapore, and Winifred Evelyn Fergusson, he was educated at Rugby and Oriel College, Oxford.

Rugby Union career

Amateur career

He played rugby for Oxford University.

International career

He gained 5 caps.

Diplomatic career

He was a 2nd Lieutenant with the 60th Rifles. After 2 years with the King's Royal Rifle Corps, he entered Her Majesty's Diplomatic Service in 1956.

He was British Ambassador to South Africa 1982–84, deputy under secretary of state at the Foreign and Commonwealth Office 1984-87 and British Ambassador to France 1987–92.

Honours

He was an honorary fellow of Oriel College, Oxford and holds an honorary LLD from Aberdeen University. He was appointed KCMG in the 1987 Birthday Honours, GCVO in 1992, GCMG in the 1993 New Year Honours, and a Grand Officier of the Légion d'Honneur. He served as King of Arms of the Order of St Michael and St George from 1996 until 2007.

Business career

He was Chairman of Coutts from 1993 to 1999, and of the Savoy Hotel Group 1994–98. He was Chairman of the governors of Rugby School from 1995 to 2002 and a trustee of the National Gallery from 1995 to 2002.

Family
Fergusson married Sara Carolyn Montgomery Cuninghame (nee Gordon Lennox) and they were to have a son, also named Ewen, and daughters Iona and Anna.  His son was also to attend Oriel College, Oxford.

References

Sources
Debrett's People of Today, 2007

External links
Interview with Sir Ewen Alastair John Fergusson & transcript, British Diplomatic Oral History Programme, Churchill College, Cambridge, 1998

Offices held 

1932 births
2017 deaths
Knights Grand Cross of the Order of St Michael and St George
Knights Grand Cross of the Royal Victorian Order
People educated at Rugby School
Alumni of Oriel College, Oxford
Grand Officiers of the Légion d'honneur
King's Royal Rifle Corps officers
Scottish rugby union players
Scotland international rugby union players
Ambassadors and High Commissioners of the United Kingdom to South Africa
Ambassadors of the United Kingdom to France
Principal Private Secretaries to the Secretary of State for Foreign and Commonwealth Affairs
Oxford University RFC players
Rugby union locks